George Gordon, 4th Earl of Huntly (151428 October 1562) was a Scottish nobleman.

Life
He was the son of John Gordon, Lord Gordon, and Margaret Stewart, daughter of James IV and Margaret Drummond. George Gordon inherited his earldom and estates in 1524 at age 10.  As commander of the King's Army he defeated the English at the Battle of Haddon Rig in 1542, was a member of the council of Regency under James Hamilton, 2nd Earl of Arran and Cardinal Beaton and succeeded as Chancellor on the murder of Beaton in 1546.  He was captured at the Battle of Pinkie Cleugh in 1547, and held in the Tower of London but in autumn 1548 he was released when a ransom was delivered by Robert Carnegie, Lord Kinnaird.

In 1550 he accompanied Mary of Guise to France.  He joined the Protestant Lords of the Congregation in 1560, although he was "a late, reluctant, and unreliable recruit". He was a religious conservative, however, and he worked for "a form of co-existence between Catholic and reformed worship". Huntly was prepared to accept Mary, Queen of Scots, until she transferred the Earldom of Moray, which had been given to the Earl of Huntly in 1549, to her half-brother Lord James Stewart, at which point he withdrew to his estates in the North-East of Scotland.

Mary, Queen of Scots, toured the north-east in August 1562, and was refused entry to Inverness Castle on Gordon's orders. The Queen's forces captured the Castle before moving to Aberdeen where she issued a summons for Gordon.  He refused to answer and was outlawed. He marched on Aberdeen but was defeated by James Stewart, 1st Earl of Moray at the Battle of Corrichie in October 1562.  He died of apoplexy after his capture, and his son, Sir John was executed in Aberdeen.  Huntly was posthumously forfeited by parliament in May 1563.

After his death his body and goods seized at Strathbogie Castle were shipped from Aberdeen to Edinburgh. The body stood for the earl at his trial. The goods were taken to Holyrood Palace. When Mary was imprisoned at Lochleven, she was given the earl's cloth-of-estate.

Family
On 27 March 1530 he married Elizabeth Keith, daughter of Robert Keith, Master of Marischal, by whom he had nine sons and three daughters, including;
Thomas Gordon
George Gordon, 5th Earl of Huntly
Lady Margaret Gordon, who married John, Master of Forbes, son of William Forbes, 7th Lord Forbes
Lady Jean Gordon, Countess of Bothwell (154614 May 1629)
Lady Elizabeth Gordon (died 1557) married John Stewart, 4th Earl of Atholl
Alexander Gordon, Lord Gordon (d. 1553), who married Barbara Hamilton
Sir John Gordon of Findlater, executed 1562 after Corrichie.
James Gordon (born 1541)
Adam Gordon of Auchindoun (born 1545)
Patrick Gordon of Auchindoun

A letter from Edward Stanhope to the Earl of Essex, dated 6 December 1598, describes Richard Rutherford of Hunthill as "cousin german to Earl Huntly". If Stanhope was correct, then it appears George Gordon, 4th Earl of Huntly, fathered an additional daughter:
(daughter) Gordon married John Rutherford of Hunthill

Ancestry

Notes

References

Sources

Bonner, Elizabeth, 'The Earl of Huntly and the King of France, 1548: Man for Rent', English Historical Review, vol. 120, no.485 (Feb 2005), 80–103.
Robertson, Joseph, Inventaires de la Royne Descosse, Banntayne Club, (1863), xxii-xxv, 49–56.

1514 births
1562 deaths
4
Scottish generals
Scottish politicians
Lords of the Congregation
16th-century Scottish peers
Court of James V of Scotland
Members of the Privy Council of Scotland
Lord Provosts of Aberdeen
Lord chancellors of Scotland
Privy Council of Mary, Queen of Scots